The J. C. Penney Co. Warehouse Building, formerly also known as Edison Brothers Warehouse Building, and now Edison Condominiums, is a historic warehouse building in downtown St. Louis, Missouri.  The building now serves as a condo-hotel.

History
The building was constructed in 1929 as a warehouse for the J.C. Penney retail chain. It occupied the building until 1954, after which it was donated to the University of Missouri as a location for an education center, which never materialized. In 1967, the university leased the warehouse to Edison Brothers Stores, which used it as a warehouse for its retail operations until 1994. In 1983, the company commissioned muralist Richard Haas to paint a trompe-l'œil mural on three sides of the building that mimicked architectural stonework, using themes derived from the 1904 St. Louis World's Fair. The building reopened in 2001 after a $54 million renovation as a combination of condominiums and a hotel, first under the Sheraton brand but currently as a Hotel RL.

References

"J. C. Penney Co. Warehouse Building - St. Louis, Missouri" Waymark
Edison Condominimums: 400 South 14th Street - St. Louis Lofts

Buildings and structures in St. Louis
Economy of St. Louis
Warehouses on the National Register of Historic Places
Commercial buildings completed in 1929
Commercial buildings on the National Register of Historic Places in Missouri
JCPenney
National Register of Historic Places in St. Louis